Pandemis capnobathra is a moth of the  family Tortricidae. It is found in northern and eastern parts of Madagascar.

The female has a wingspan of 36–40 mm

References

Moths described in 1930
Pandemis
Moths of Madagascar
Moths of Africa